Alexeyevka is a rural locality (a village) and the administrative centre of Rassvetovsky Selsoviet, Belebeyevsky District, Bashkortostan, Russia. The population was 575 as of 2010. There are 11 streets.

Geography 
Alexeyevka is located 6 km west of Belebey (the district's administrative centre) by road. Belebey is the nearest rural locality.

References 

Rural localities in Belebeyevsky District